The 2009–10 Missouri State Bears basketball team represented Missouri State University in National Collegiate Athletic Association (NCAA) Division I men's basketball during the 2009–10 season. Playing in the Missouri Valley Conference (MVC) and led by second-year head coach Cuonzo Martin, the Bears finished the season with a 24–12 overall record and won the 2010 CollegeInsider.com Postseason Tournament.

In MVC play, the Bears finished in seventh place with a 8–10 record. They advanced to the quarterfinals of the 2009 MVC tournament, where they lost to Wichita State, 73–63.

Roster

Schedule
 
|-
!colspan=9 style=| Exhibition

|-
!colspan=9 style=| Regular season

|-
!colspan=9 style=| Missouri Valley tournament

|-
|-
!colspan=9 style=| CollegeInsider.com Postseason Tournament

References

Missouri State Bears basketball seasons
Missouri State
CollegeInsider.com Postseason Tournament championship seasons
Missouri State
Missouri State Bears Basketball Team
Missouri State Bears Basketball Team